Roman Gods is the first album by The Fleshtones. The album was produced by Richard Mazda and largely recorded at Skyline Studios in New York City in June 1981, with the exception of one track ("The World Has Changed"), which was recorded at RKO Studios in London in February 1981. The record sleeve was designed by lead singer Peter Zaremba.

Trouser Press called Roman Gods a "big leap forward" from the band's debut EP Up-Front, noting that it adds "new personality and passion to the beat".

The song "Shadow-line (to J. Conrad)" was performed by The Fleshtones in the concert film Urgh! A Music War.

Track listing

Personnel

The Fleshtones
Bill Milhizer – drums
Jan Marek Pakulski – bass guitar
Keith Streng – guitar
Gordon Spaeth – alto saxophone, harmonica, art direction
Peter Zaremba – vocals, illustrations, design

Additional musicians and production
David Arnoff – photography
Carl Grasso – illustrations
David Lichtenstein – engineering
Richard Mazda – production
Dave Le Neve-Foster – engineering on "The World Has Changed"
Arthur Payson – engineering
John Weiss – tenor saxophone

Charts

Album

Single

References

1982 debut albums
I.R.S. Records albums
The Fleshtones albums
Albums produced by Richard Mazda